Dar Riz-e Olya (also Romanized as Dar Rīz-e ‘Olyā; also known as Dar Rīz-e Bālā and Dar Rīz) is a village in Roshtkhar Rural District, in the Central District of Roshtkhar County, Razavi Khorasan Province, Iran. At the 2006 census, its population was 320, in 70 families.

References 

Populated places in Roshtkhar County